Spyro: Year of the Dragon is a 2000 platform game developed by Insomniac Games and published by Sony Computer Entertainment for the PlayStation. Year of the Dragon is the third game in the Spyro series. The game was the last Spyro game Insomniac developed; their next game would be Ratchet & Clank for the PlayStation 2.

Named after the animal of the Chinese zodiac, which was the symbol at the time of the game's release, Year of the Dragon follows the titular purple dragon Spyro as he travels to the "Forgotten Worlds" after 150 magical dragon eggs are stolen from the land of the dragons by an evil sorceress. Players travel across thirty different worlds gathering gems and eggs. Year of the Dragon introduced new characters and minigames to the series, as well as offering improved graphics and music.

By 2007, the game sold more than three million units worldwide and received critical acclaim. Reviewers noted the game built on the successful formula of its predecessors by adding new activities and expansive environments. Year of the Dragon was followed by the multiplatform title Spyro: Enter the Dragonfly, and was later re-released under the Greatest Hits label, and remade as part of the Spyro Reignited Trilogy in 2018.

Gameplay

Year of the Dragon is primarily played from a third person perspective; its gameplay is similar to its predecessors. The main objective of the game is to collect special dragon eggs which are scattered across 36 worlds. These eggs are hidden, or are given as rewards for completing certain tasks and levels. The worlds of Spyro are linked together by "homeworlds" or "hubs", large worlds which contain gateways to many other levels. To proceed to the next hub, the character must complete five worlds, gather a certain number of eggs, and defeat a boss. Players do not need to gather every egg to complete the main portion of the game or gain access to new levels; in fact, certain eggs can only be found by returning to the world at a later time. Gems are scattered across the worlds, hidden in crates and jars. These gems are used to bribe a bear named Moneybags to release captured characters and activate things which help Spyro progress through levels. Gems, along with the number of eggs collected, count to the total completion percentage of the game.

The player controls the dragon Spyro for most of the game. Spyro's health is measured by his companion Sparx, a dragonfly who changes color and then disappears after taking progressively more damage. If the player does not have Sparx, then the next hit would cause the player to lose a life and restart at the last saved checkpoint. Consuming small wildlife known as "fodder" regenerates Sparx. Spyro has several abilities, including breathing fire, swimming and diving, gliding, and headbutting, which he can use to explore and combat a variety of enemies, most of which are rhinoceros-like creatures called Rhynocs. Some foes are only vulnerable to certain moves. Spyro can run through "Powerup Gates", which give him special abilities for a limited period.

Year of the Dragon introduces playable characters other than Spyro, known as critters, which are unlocked by paying off Moneybags as the player proceeds through the game. Subsequently, the player plays as the character in specially marked sections of levels. Each critter has their own special moves and abilities. Sheila the Kangaroo, for example, can double jump, while Sgt. Byrd is armed with rocket launchers and can fly indefinitely.

Besides the primary quest to find dragon eggs, Year of the Dragon features an extensive set of minigames, which are split off from the levels into smaller zones. Some of the minigames were featured in Spyro 2: Ripto's Rage! and were subsequently expanded for Year of the Dragon, while others are entirely new to the series. These minigames are played by Spyro or the other playable characters.

Plot
The game opens in the land of the dragons, where Spyro and his kin are celebrating the "Year of the Dragon", an event that occurs every twelve years when new dragon eggs are brought to the realm. During the celebration, the Sorceress' apprentice, Bianca, invades the Dragon Realms with an army of rhino-based creatures called Rhynocs, stealing all of the Dragon eggs. The Sorceress spreads the eggs throughout several worlds, split up into four home realms: Sunrise Spring, Midday Garden, Evening Lake, and Midnight Mountain. Spyro, Sparx, and Spyro's friend Hunter are sent down a hole to find the thieves and recover the dragon eggs.

Spyro emerges in the Forgotten Realms (lands once inhabited by the dragons), where magic has gradually been disappearing. These worlds are under the iron-fisted reign of the Sorceress and her Rhynoc army. Spyro meets with Sheila the Kangaroo, Sergeant Byrd the Penguin, Bentley the Yeti, and Agent 9 the Monkey, all who help him on his quest. Spyro travels through each world, acquiring aid from the local inhabitants and rescuing the dragon eggs. It is revealed that the Sorceress banished the dragons, not realizing they were the source of magic, and wants to use the baby dragons' wings to concoct a spell that can grant her immortality. Once Bianca learns this, she turns against the Sorceress and helps Spyro defeat her. After the credits, the player can continue to find dragon eggs and gems to unlock the true ending, defeating the Sorceress once more for the final dragon egg. Spyro returns all of the baby dragons to the Dragon Realms. Along the journey to help Spyro recover the eggs, Hunter forms a crush on Bianca, and they begin a relationship, with Spyro and Sparx looking on in dismay.

Development
Development of Spyro: Year of the Dragon spanned about ten and a half months, from November 1999 to September 2000; the development team was influenced by a host of other games, including Doom and Crash Bandicoot. It was first released in the U.S. on October 10, 2000. Among the new features touted before the game's release was "Auto Challenge Tuning", which Insomniac CEO Ted Price described as "invented to even out the gameplay difficulty curve for players of different abilities". The levels were made much larger than those in Spyro 2, so that more areas for minigames could be added; to prevent player confusion on where to go next, these areas were designed to load separately from the main hubs. Price stated that the addition of critters was a way to make the game more enjoyable and varied, instead of just adding more moves for Spyro. The game was named "Year of the Dragon" simply because it was released during 2000, the year of the Dragon in the Chinese zodiac.

Music

The music for Year of the Dragon was composed and produced by Stewart Copeland, former drummer for the rock band The Police, and composer Ryan Beveridge, who worked on all the tracks with Copeland, with Copeland making sure the tracks sounded cohesive to the first 2 games while working with Beveridge. During the band's hiatus, Copeland composed several movie soundtracks, and composed the scores for the previous Spyro titles; Price stated that Copeland's offering for the third installment was his best work to date. In an interview, Copeland stated that his creative process for writing the music for the Spyro series always began by playing through the levels, trying to get a feel for each world's "atmosphere". Copeland noted the challenge of writing for games was to create music that would both be interesting to listen to and complemented the gameplay; his approach was to incorporate more complicated harmonies and basslines so that the music could seem fresh for players, even after repeated listening. He complimented the compact disc format of the PlayStation and its support for high quality audio; there were no technical constraints that stopped him from producing the sound he wanted. Copeland recorded entire orchestral scores for extra flourish when the visuals called for an expansive sound, but used more percussive and beat-driven melodies for "high-energy" moments in the game.

Noticeably, the soundtrack has inconsistencies between the game's original release and its Greatest Hits release. One example is the speedway levels all sharing the same theme in the original release, whereas the Greatest Hits release assigns the theme to Harbor Speedway, while giving the other speeedways their own unique themes. The Reignited Trilogy version rectifies this by using the soundtrack from the Greatest Hits release.

Reception

Year of the Dragon received "universal acclaim" according to review aggregator Metacritic. Year of the Dragon was remastered along with the first two Spyro games in the Spyro Reignited Trilogy.

In previews, publications such as IGN and GameSpot noted that the graphics had been improved, and that there were many new characters and locations. The new minigames were previewed, and IGN pointed out that they offered enough complexity to back up the simple gameplay. In an interview with GameSpot, Ted Price stated that the emphasis for the title was on the new critters, but that Spyro would not be left behind in the story. Year of the Dragon also implemented crack protection, in addition to the copy protection previous games had contained. This helped prevent hackers from cracking the game until two months after release.

Despite the positive response the game would go on to receive, Year of the Dragon was developer Insomniac Games' last Spyro title. In an interview, CEO Ted Price said that the company stopped producing the games because they could not do anything new with the character, and that after five years of development on a single series, the team wanted to do something different. Future Spyro games were produced by, among other developers, Digital Eclipse, Equinox Digital Entertainment, Eurocom, Krome Studios, Étranges Libellules, Tantalus Media, Vicarious Visions, and Toys for Bob.

GameSpot noted that while Year of the Dragon made no significant changes to the formula of its predecessors, the combination of new playable characters, more detailed graphics, and the wide variety of minigames made the game worth buying. IGN praised the game's appeal to all ages and the polished levels, as well as the successful multi-character focus. GamePro noted that the ability of the game to automatically drop the difficulty if players get stuck was an excellent feature. NextGens Kevin Rice provided one of the most positive reviews in which he stated the top-notch level design, intuitive controls and excellent graphics made the title the best Spyro game to date, and arguably the best PlayStation game overall. Publications like PSXExtreme thought the music helped bring atmosphere to the varied worlds, and AllGame enthused that "Insomniac should be commended for realizing the importance of music in games; it seems to enhance the whole experience." Other points of praise were the voice acting and character development.

Some reviewers critiqued that the camera could be annoying at times, particularly when it was unable to keep up with Spyro. Joseph Parazen of GameRevolution found the sound to be well done but nothing extraordinary, arguing that the background music and sound effects were both fairly generic, while the voice acting was better than usual. He also called the game's premise its only real flaw, as it was too unoriginal, but added that "the story that unfolds as you actually play the game is flawlessly interwoven and quite entertaining". Other publications cautioned that elements of the game might feel too much like those of its predecessors.

The game was a finalist for the "Console Action/Adventure Game of the Year", "Outstanding Art Direction", and "Overall Console Game of the Year" awards at the Academy of Interactive Arts & Sciences' 4th Annual Interactive Achievement Awards, all of which went to The Legend of Zelda: Majora's Mask, Final Fantasy IX, and SSX, respectively.

Sales
The game sold more than two million units in the U.S. It received a "Platinum" sales award from the Entertainment and Leisure Software Publishers Association (ELSPA), indicating sales of at least 300,000 units in the UK. As of June 30, 2007, the game sold more than 3.2 million units worldwide.

Notes

References

External links

2000 video games
3D platform games
Insomniac Games games
PlayStation (console) games
PlayStation Network games
Single-player video games
Sony Interactive Entertainment games
Universal Interactive games
Spyro the Dragon video games
Video game sequels
Video games developed in the United States
Fantasy video games
Video games scored by Stewart Copeland